CUO may refer to:

 Cadet Under Officer rank in Senior Division & Senior Women Army wings of the National Cadet Corps (India)
 CuO - Copper(II) oxide
 COU is the ICAO airline designator for Aerocuahonte, Mexico
 Compaq Users Organisation
 Cadet Under Officer in the Australian Army Cadets
 Cadet Under Officer in the Australian Air Force Cadets

Refer also:

 King Cuo of Zhongshan

CUO-abbreviation of Chief Underwriting Officer used in insurance company or top underwriting occupation of an insurance company